Anqolab-e Do (also Romanized as Ānqolāb-e Do) is a village in Anaran Rural District, in the Central District of Dehloran County, Ilam Province, Iran. At the 2006 census, its population was 896, in 190 families.

References 

Populated places in Dehloran County